Thraciidae is a taxonomic family of small saltwater clams, marine bivalves in the order Anomalodesmata.

Selected genera and species
Genera and species within the family Thraciidae include:

 Asthenothaerus Carpenter, 1864
 Asthenothaerus diegensis (Dall, 1915)
 Asthenothaerus hemphilli Dall, 1886
 Asthenothaerus villosior Carpenter, 1864
 Bushia Dall, 1886
 Bushia elegans (Dall, 1886)
 Bushia rushii (Pilsbry, 1897)
 Cyathodonta Conrad, 1849
 Lampeia MacGinitie, 1959
 Lampeia adamsi (MacGinitie, 1959)
 Parvithracia Finlay, 1927
 Parvithracia cuneata Powell, 1937
 Parvithracia suteri Finlay, 1927
 Thracia Leach in Blainville, 1824

References

 Powell A. W. B., New Zealand Mollusca, William Collins Publishers Ltd, Auckland, New Zealand 1979 
 Sartori, A. F. ; Domaneschi, O., The functional morphology of the Antarctic bivalve Thracia meridionalis Smith, 1885 (Anomalodesmata: Thraciidae), Journal of Molluscan Studies, v. 71, p. 199-210, 2005

 
Bivalve families